Space Quest is a series of six comic science fiction adventure games released between 1986 and 1995. The games follow the adventures of a hopeless janitor named Roger Wilco, who campaigns through the galaxy for "truth, justice and really clean floors". 

Initially created for Sierra On-Line by Mark Crowe and Scott Murphy (who called themselves the "Two Guys from Andromeda"), the games parodied both science fiction properties such as Star Wars and Star Trek (the theme song itself is a parody of the Star Wars theme), as well as pop-culture phenomena from McDonald's to Microsoft. The series featured a silly sense of humor heavily reliant on puns and wacky storylines. Roger Wilco, a perpetual loser, is often depicted as the underdog who repeatedly saves the universe (often by accident), only to be either ignored or punished for violating minor regulations in the process.

Development 
Scott Murphy and Mark Crowe, who had already worked together on the Sierra game The Black Cauldron, wanted to create a humorous science fiction adventure game. They also wanted it to star a janitor (a choice possibly inspired by the mop-wielding main character from Infocom's humorous sci-fi text adventure Planetfall).

Murphy commented that "Sierra was in a mindset where everything was medieval and it was all fairly serious. I wanted to do a game that was more fun. We even liked the idea of 'fun death'! I mean, if the player is gonna die or fail, they should at least get a laugh out of it. So we came up with the idea of making death amusing. Let's face it, most adventure games involve a good deal of frustration for the player. But we felt that if we made failure fun, to an extent, you might have players actually going back and looking for new ways to die, just to see what happens!"

Crowe noted, "We wanted to do two things for the player. One, we wanted him to feel as if he were in a movie, where he could just sort of kick back and enjoy the scenery. We also wanted the player to feel as if he really was the character on the screen."

Although skeptical, Ken Williams gave the idea a shot. Scott and Mark created a short demo, which ended up becoming the first four rooms of Space Quest I, at which point Williams gave the project a green light.

Both Space Quest I and II were developed in Adventure Game Interpreter, Sierra's own programming language. Space Quest III was written in Sierra's Creative Interpreter (SCI), which had 3-D capabilities. Space Quest IV marked an evolution in terms of graphics by increasing the number of colors from 16 to 256.

Roger Wilco 
Roger Wilco is a fictional character and the protagonist of the Space Quest series, introduced in Space Quest: The Sarien Encounter in 1986. Roger is depicted as a bumbling but well-meaning everyman character. He is a space faring janitor who has a tendency to attract trouble and stumble into dangerous or interesting situations. Despite saving the universe on multiple occasions, he seems unable to gain any respect from society, and works as some type of "sanitation engineer" throughout the series.

The character's name is a reference to voice procedure, one of many puns in the series (it means "receiving you, will comply"). The first two Space Quest games allowed the player to choose the character's name, which defaulted to Roger Wilco if left blank. This feature was later removed in the remake of the first game.

Roger is originally a janitor from the planet Xenon of the Earnon system. He is first introduced as the janitor and sole survivor of the scientific research ship Arcada, which was overrun by the apparently hostile Sariens. After several extremely deadly adventures and a bit of janitorial work, he enters the StarCon Academy. Graduating in Space Quest V, he is promoted from a janitor to captain of the garbage scow SCS Eureka. He also meets Beatrice Creakworm Wankmeister, with whom he becomes romantically involved. In Space Quest 6, his spot in the limelight ends as he is busted back down to janitor and assigned to the backwoods of the cosmos.

According to Space Quest IV, Roger would eventually marry Beatrice and they would have a son (Roger Wilco Jr.) who would later travel back in time to save Roger's life. Beatrice is absent from Space Quest 6, but she is mentioned in the game's closing credits and by Roger himself. By the time of the fictional Space Quest XII, when Roger Jr. would be a young adult, Roger would be "unavailable" for some reason. The details are never disclosed.

While Roger retains his basic appearance and sustains no lasting damage from his swashbuckling and repeated near-mutilations, his hair begins the series brown and changes to blonde in the upgrade between parts III and IV. (The same has happened to fellow adventure protagonists Guybrush Threepwood and Devon Aidendale, in Devon's case to the other direction.) While this retcon is never addressed in the game itself, it spawned a full-fledged fan game, Space Quest: The Lost Chapter.

Including him on the 2004 list of "top ten working class heroes", Retro Gamer opined that "for a hero that Ken Williams (co-founder of Sierra) was initially unimpressed with, Roger Wilco has become a classic cult figure."

Games

Space Quest: The Sarien Encounter 

The original Space Quest game was released in October 1986 and quickly became a hit, selling in excess of 100,000 copies (sales are believed to be around 200,000 to date, not including the many compilations it has been included in). A remake was released in 1991 as Space Quest I: Roger Wilco in the Sarien Encounter.

Space Quest II: Vohaul's Revenge 

Released in 1987; Roger, with his newfound status of Hero, is transferred to the Xenon Orbital Station 4 and promoted to head (and only) janitor. All is quiet until he is abducted by Sludge Vohaul, who was behind the original Sarien attack of the Arcada. As Roger is being transported to the Labion labour mines as punishment for thwarting Sludge's original plan, the prison ship crash-lands in a nearby jungle upon the planet. Our hero manages to escape his pursuers and the dangers of the Labion jungle and soon reaches Sludge's asteroid base. Once again, it's up to Roger alone to stop Vohaul's evil plan: to eradicate sentient life from Xenon by launching millions of cloned insurance salesmen at the planet.

Space Quest III: The Pirates of Pestulon 

Released in 1989; Roger's escape pod from the end of Space Quest II is captured by an automated garbage freighter. He escapes the robot-controlled scow by repairing an old ship, the Aluminum Mallard (a play on Howard Hughes' "Spruce Goose" and Star Wars''' Millennium Falcon). He eventually discovers the sinister activities of a video game company known as ScumSoft run by the "Pirates of Pestulon".

 Space Quest IV: Roger Wilco and the Time Rippers 

Released in 1991; in this installment, Roger embarks on a time-travel adventure through Space Quest games both real and fictional. A reborn Sludge Vohaul from the fictional Space Quest XII: Vohaul's Revenge II chases Roger through time in an attempt to finally kill him. Roger also visits settings from the fictional Space Quest X: Latex Babes of Estros (whose title is a parody of Infocom's game Leather Goddesses of Phobos) and from Space Quest I; in the latter, the graphics and music revert to the style of the original game and Roger is threatened by a group of monochromatic bikers who consider Roger's 256 colors to be pretentious (or comment on other graphics modes if played in EGA or monochrome).

The games Space Quest XII: Vohaul's Revenge II and Space Quest X: Latex Babes of Estros were never actually developed or released as full games, they exist only internally in Space Quest IV.

 Space Quest V: Roger Wilco – The Next Mutation 

Released in 1993: in Space Quest V, Roger is now a cadet in the StarCon academy. He graduates (or rather, cheats through the final exam) and is appointed captain of his own spacecraft (actually a space garbage scow). The main plot is to stop a mutagenic disease that is spreading through the galaxy by discovering its source, and fighting everyone that got infected. In the end, the disease infected the crew members of the SCS Goliath, a powerful warship, whose commander, Raemes T. Quirk (a rather blatant spoof of Captain Kirk), subsequently attacks the Eureka. In the end, Roger sacrifices his ship to get rid of the plague – and suddenly, if temporarily, becomes the commander of the fleet's flagship.

Roger's cheating is, along with Raemes T. Quirk, an homage to William Shatner's Star Trek character, who cheated on his own Starfleet exam by reprogramming a "no-win" scenario so that he could successfully complete it. In a typical twist of luck, however, Roger's exam scores are still achieved by accident.

This entry was the first in the Space Quest series where only one of the two guys from andromeda, Mark Crowe, lead a Space Quest project, due to the fact that Scott Murphy was working on other projects.

 Space Quest 6: Roger Wilco in The Spinal Frontier 

Released in 1995, this game was the last to be released in the Space Quest series. Having defeated the diabolical pukoid mutants in Space Quest V, Captain Roger Wilco triumphantly returns to StarCon headquarters – only to be court-martialed due to breaking StarCon regulations while saving the galaxy. He's busted down to Janitor Second Class, and assigned to the SCS DeepShip 86 (a parody of Star Trek: Deep Space Nine), commanded by Commander Kielbasa, a Cowardly Lion look-alike whose name is taken from the Polish sausage as well as being a play on the names of both the feline Kilrathi from the video game series Wing Commander and of the character Mufasa from the animated motion picture The Lion King. His voice is a parody of Captain Jean-Luc Picard from Star Trek: The Next Generation. The main villain in the game is a wrinkly old lady named Sharpei, a pun on the dog Shar Pei, a wrinkly dog.

The game's subtitle comes from the final portion, in which Roger has to undergo miniaturization and enter the body of a shipmate and romantic interest. (This segment also provided the game's original subtitle, Where in Corpsman Santiago is Roger Wilco?, which was not used due to legal threats from the makers of the Carmen Sandiego products.)

Sadly, once again, only one of the Two Guys from Andromeda worked on this game. This time though, it was Scott Murphy who sat in the director's chair, more or less. Scott was actually a co-director of Space Quest 6 with another Sierra employee, Josh Mandel, who'd worked on many of the behind-the-scenes aspects of Space Quest IV and V, as well as helping create the SCI remake of King's Quest I. Josh actually worked on and created the majority of Space Quest 6, and had to step out when the project was already near completion, and that's when Scott Murphy just stepped in and did the rest.

 Space Quest 6: The Spinal Frontier Interactive Demo 

The demo for Space Quest 6 is actually a short game unto itself. It uses the Space Quest 6 engine and takes place aboard the SCS DeepShip 86 but is a stand-alone adventure. The ship is taken over by Borg-like invaders called the Bjorn, and Wilco must defeat them.

 In-fiction future sequels 
In Space Quest IV, Roger travels into both the past and future of the game's timeline. Even in-game characters are conscious of living in a video game, and refer to eras with sequel numbers, not temporal units (such as years), even though specific years are named elsewhere in the Space Quest canon. Portions of the game took place in the time frames of the following "sequels":
 Space Quest X: Latex Babes of Estros (a reference to Infocom's Leather Goddesses of Phobos): In this timeframe, Roger or his son, Roger Jr. had had an undetermined affair with Zondra of the Latex Babes, which he ended abruptly. This timeframe contains the planet Estros and the Galaxy Galleria space station mall.
 Space Quest XII: Vohaul's Revenge II: In this timeframe, Vohaul's consciousness has been uploaded in the Xenon Super Computer and infected it like a virus. He took over the planet and is sending his minions back in time to kill Roger Wilco. An underground resistance is formed against him, including his nemesis' son, Roger Wilco Jr.

These games were never actually created, and only exist within the plot of Space Quest IV. Scott Murphy has stated that he did intend to use these titles if the series had made it that far and the storyline still permitted it.

 Roger Wilco's Spaced Out Game Pack 
Budget software including several mini-games taken from the Space Quest series. Including hoverspeeder, Monolith Burger maker, and Ms. Astro Chicken.

 Planet Pinball Planet Pinball is a series of three Space Quest IV themed pinball boards in Take a Break! Pinball. The boards include; Level One: Planet Xenon in the Beginning, Level Two: Spaced Travel, Level Three: Reformation Day.

 Hoyle Book of Games 
Roger Wilco appears as an opponent in Hoyle's Official Book of Games, Volume I. He has conversations with the other opponents, talking about his adventures in the first three Space Quest games. Roger Wilco is trapped in the Hoyle game, and is trying to find a way to escape back to his game world.

Roger Wilco returns in Hoyle 3, along with bad guy characters, Arnoid and Vohaul, but the characters are limited to talking about the game itself.

Roger also appears as an opponent in Hoyle Classic Card Games, the fourth game in the series. Again, interaction is limited to the game only.

 Cancelled games 

 Space Quest VII: Return to Roman Numerals 
Sierra tried on several occasions to revive the series for another episode, with a working subtitle of The Return to Roman Numerals, since the previous game was titled Space Quest 6, not Space Quest VI.

Development of Space Quest VII was underway in 1996 when Sierra released The Space Quest Collection, which consisted of Space Quest I through 6 and included a brief trailer of Space Quest VII (consisting of Roger strapping a giant rocket to his back and using it to push himself forward on roller skates in a scene reminiscent of Wile E. Coyote). Little was released regarding story line, interface, et cetera, although there was speculation that the game would introduce a multiplayer aspect. Scott Murphy said during development that Space Quest VII would contain some 3D elements, but would not require the use of a 3D accelerator card. Due to poor sales of Grim Fandango, a high-profile adventure game by LucasArts, there was a perception that humorous adventure games were no longer viable, so when Vivendi took over Sierra, Space Quest VII was cancelled.

This project was eventually restarted in 1999, and pitched to management, but ultimately did not have enough support to continue within the company. Few details are known about the SQVII relaunch, save that there was one very ardent supporter, who later left Vivendi.

 Space Quest 
Another Space Quest began development by Escape Factory for the Microsoft Xbox video game console in 2002, entitled simply Space Quest.

This attempt at creating a new Space Quest was announced on February 7, 2002. Development proceeded for almost a year and a half before the project was cancelled. According to Space Quest 6 designer Josh Mandel, the SQVII designers were forbidden from using story elements from the original Space Quest games or from even playing the games. This is disputable, since other sources claimed the developers had played the games before. Website FYI.com, also claimed that this "gutted" SQVII would not have been an adventure game at all and would have been released only on game console platforms such as the Xbox rather than the PC. Since then, the Vivendi's Product Manager Bruce Goodwill, has confirmed that the title was going to be released only on console platforms.

The game was planned as a departure from the main Space Quest series, rumors it starred a new character named "Wilger", although Roger Wilco was playable (as seen in a production video). Though it would have maintained a comedic theme in space, no plan was made to connect it to the original series. It was cancelled around 2003.

 Collections 
 The Space Quest Trilogy: Roger Wilco – The Other World Series (1992) – a collection containing Space Quest VGA, Space Quest II and Space Quest III on floppy disks.
 The Space Quest Saga (1993) – This collection contained games I (VGA remake), II, III and IV all on floppy disks.
 The Space Quest 15th Anniversary Collector's Edition (1994) – Released for Sierra's 15th anniversary, this contained games I-V and Roger Wilco's Spaced Out Game Pack, plus a video featuring the Two Guys from Andromeda and a complete history of the game series. It also contained a few foreign language editions of some of the games. There is also a secret bonus program giving the strange history of the World Famous Talking Bear.
 Roger Wilco Unclogged (1995) – All the above, plus a humorous "Inside Space Quest" video, but without the Two Guys video
 Space Quest Collection Series: Starring Roger Wilco (1997) – All six games, plus a preview of episode VII.
 Space Quest Collection: A Long Time Ago in A Janitor Closet Far Far Away (2006) – Released by Vivendi Universal Games and contains all six games (only the VGA remake of SQ1).
 Space Quest 1+2+3 & 4+5+6 collections (2010) – Two collections on GoG.com, minus the VGA remake.

 Collection bonus material 
 Funseeker's Guide to Eastern Madera County History of Space Quest Inside Space Quest Fall 2006 releases 
Vivendi Universal has re-released the Space Quest Collection (originally named Space Quest Compilation) that is compatible with Windows XP. The collection was released September 15, 2006.

The Space Quest games were made compatible by the licensing of DOSBox, a free program that allows users to play old DOS games on Windows XP. Valve's digital distribution platform re-released the XP/Vista compatible Space Quest Collection on July 23, 2009. It is so far unavailable in Australia and New Zealand.

 Other media Space Quest merchandise included the Space Quest III VHS tape and pin, Space Quest 6 mug, calling card and patch and an autographed picture of Roger Wilco.

Two strategy guides were released that contained novelizations of the first five games from Roger Wilco's perspective.

The first of these included The Space Quest Companion by Peter and Jeremy Spear. The book is similar to Peter Spear's The King's Quest Companion and The Official Uncensored Leisure Suit Larry Bedside Companion. The first edition covered the first four games (with a preview of SQ5), and the second added the fifth game. It was written from the perspective of Roger Wilco sending journals on disks back into the past, so that his adventures could be made into video games so that his great-grandparents (x-times removed) would have a chance to meet each other and fall in love through their mutual love of the games. Thus, by inspiring the game designers to create the games, he insured his own future existence. Each story began with Roger's daydreams and his fantasies of marrying Cornucopia Agricorp and later Beatrice Wankmeister.

The other was The Official Guide To Roger Wilco's Space Adventures by Jill Champion. It is similar to her The Official Book of Police Quest. It came in two editions as well. The book contains two interviews with Roger Wilco (one just after events of SQIV, and the other after SQV). The novels themselves are written as Roger's running monologues during his adventures. The first edition covers SQ EGA to SQIV, and the second edition covers SQI remake up until SQV. The novel of SQ1 in the first edition is based on the original SQ1, and the version in the second edition is based on the remake of SQ1.

Adventure Comics (a division of Malibu Comics) released three issues in 1992 of a comic based on Space Quest I under the name The Adventures of Roger Wilco. The first was written by John Shaw and was in full colour. The other two were written by Paul O'Connor and were black and white. The print run was very small, and the books are very hard to find now.

 Legacy Thy Dungeonman II, a text adventure game from the creators of Homestar Runner, uses cover art that depicts the title character holding a mop in the same way Roger Wilco does on the Space Quest box art. He is also described as a "custodial knight" and the mop is also used to defeat enemies in a maze portion of the game.

 Fan-made games 
The series has remained popular with Sierra fans, and several fan sites are still active and maintain a community dedicated to the games. There have been several attempts to create a Space Quest fan game, such as the now-canceled SQ7.org project, and several fan games have actually been released.

Games set in the Space Quest universe:
 Space Quest 0: Replicated – a prequel to Space Quest I.
 Space Quest: The Lost Chapter – set between the second and third games.
 Space Quest IV.5: Roger Wilco And The Voyage Home – set between the fourth and fifth game.
 Space Quest: Vohaul Strikes Back – an original hi-res installment set after Space Quest 6.
 Space Quest 2 Remake: Vohaul's Revenge – a remake of Space Quest 2 in the style of Space Quest IV, developed by Infamous Adventures.
 Space Quest: Incinerations – another original hi-res installment, with a more action-oriented approach in the traditional adventure genre and with a modern sensibility. According to Rock, Paper, Shotgun, Incinerations "completely re-imagines the whole Space Quest series as a sci-fi action thriller, focusing hard on character and drama while still managing to be just as tongue-in-cheek and funny as anything else that bears its name."
 Space Quest Minus 1: Decisions of the Elders – a hybrid combination of old-style AGI graphics with icon-driven interface.

Games influenced by Space Quest:
 Cosmos Quest – Adventure game influenced by Space Quest.

 SpaceVenture 
On April 14, 2012, Mark Crowe and Scott Murphy announced they had reunited and were planning an original adventure game set in space. They established a new game development company called Two Guys from Andromeda for that purpose. Co-founder of the company Chris Pope (dubbed as "Space Pope" from fans) works to operate its marketing and interact directly with fans as well as Executive Producer. A Kickstarter project was launched to fund the development of the new game or SpaceVenture, with plans to feature the voice of Gary Owens (narrator of Space Quest IV and 6), prior to his death in 2015.

On June 13, 2012, they achieved their goal of $500,000 eventually raising $539,768 from their Kickstarter campaign, and began work on the game. In September 2012, enough funding was achieved to enable them to translate the game into German, Spanish, French and Italian.

The game acts as a spiritual successor to the Space Quest series, including the use of a blue-collar worker (now a repairman rather than a janitor) as its protagonist. The hero in this case is named "Ace Hardway" after the home improvement chain Ace Hardware. Another character is "Cluck Y'egger", after test pilot Chuck Yeager. He is a chicken superhero based on the Astro Chicken running gag in the Space Quest series. The game will be rendered in CGI, but a "retro graphics" feature has been proposed.

In June 2013, it was announced that there would be a playable Alpha demo at the 2013 San Diego Comicon.

In January 2014, the game had a projected late 2015 release date. In October 2015, the Two Guys of Andromeda'' promised to continue development and to release the game in November 2016. The game remains in development, but has still (as of July 2020, over eight years after reaching its funding goal) not been given a release date. On June 2, 2019, an update was released on the Two Guys from Andromeda Twitter and Kickstarter pages revealing the box art for the game.

On July 31, 2020, a complete beta was released to Kickstarter backers.

The game was finally released, over ten years since the project launched, on September 16, 2022. It was released initially to Kickstarter backers only. At launch, multiple softlocks were reported and the tutorial mode was described as "broken". Overall, the game was said to be in a "poor state" and a "mess".

References 

 
Activision Blizzard franchises
Adventure games
Science fiction comedy
Comics based on video games
Sierra Entertainment games
Video game franchises
Space opera video games
Adventure games set in space
Video game franchises introduced in 1986